Megan Parkinson (born 18 July 1996) is an English actress who has played Alys Karstark in Game of Thrones and Sam Murgatroyd in Ackley Bridge. Parkinson has also appeared in the television films Damilola, Our Loved Boy and To Walk Invisible.

Filmography

References

External links
 

Living people
21st-century English actresses
English television actresses
1996 births